The Sagichō Fire Festival , also called the Dondoyaki or by other names, is celebrated in Japan, usually on January 14 or January 15. It is a local event in each village or town to burn away the gate pine and other New Year's decoratons as well as to pray for the New Year's best fortune. Some Sagichō festivals are related to the Shintoist shrines.

The Sagichō fire festival has been celebrated in Japan at least since the 13th century, as it is mentioned in monk Kenkō's Tsurezuregusa. Because it used to be celebrated on January 14 or 15 on the lunar calendar, its origin may have been related to the Lantern Festival in China. 

Some Sagichō fire festivals that have become famous as tourist attractions are: the Dōsojin Fire Festival celebrated under in winter's snow in Nozawaonsen, Nagano; the Sagicho Fire Festival held on the seacoast in Oiso, Kanagawa; etc.

The Japanese-style fire festival is also celebrated at Japanese Shintoist shrines overseas, such as the Hilo Daijingu (ヒロ大神宮), Hilo, Hawaii.

See also 
Festival of Burning the Character Big (Japan)
Lantern Festival (China)
St. John's Fire Festival
Festival of fire

References

External links 
TOKYO Dondo Yaki – Burning New Year’s decoration

Annual events in Japan
New Year in Japan
Traditions involving fire